Yuriy Artemenko (born February 28, 1963) is a Ukrainian journalist, politician and public figure.  He is a Deputy of Ukraine IV and V convocations and is former Chairman of the National television and radio broadcasting council of Ukraine (from 2014 to 2019).

Biography
Artemenko was born in Zaporizhia, Ukraine. His parents were Anatolii (born 1926) and Jeugenia (born 1928).  He was educated at 
Taras Shevchenko National University of Kyiv, Faculty of Journalism (1983-1989), at the Interregional Academy of Personnel Management (1999-2002), where he studied Law, and at Kyiv Polytechnic Institute (2010), where he studied Administrative Management.

His wife  - Helen M. (1963 ) and son Denis (1992)

Career

1983 - Trainee, 1983-1985. - Correspondent, 1985-1987. - Senior Correspondent, 1987-1991. - Department of Zaporozhia regional newspaper "Komsomolets Zaporozhia"

1991-1996. - Deputy Chief Editor from November 1996 - Editor in Chief - Executive Director from March 2002 to 2005 - the chief editor of the newspaper "MIG" (formerly "Komsomolets Zaporozhia").

In 1998-2000. was a member of the secretariat of Zaporozhia regional organization of the National Union of Journalists of Ukraine, was advisor to the International Fund IREX (program ProMedia); was elected Zaporozhia Regional Council (1998-2002).

From 2000 to 2002 - the general director of the publishing house "Keramist" Was a member of such political parties as "Solidarity" (a member of the political council), the People's Union "Nasha Ukraina" (member of the Board, in March 2005 - July 2007 - Head of Zaporizhia regional organization), now - no party affiliation.

In 2001-2005 Was the founder and board member and vice-president of the Ukrainian Association of Press publishers. He was a member of the Public Council under the State Committee of Ukraine (2008-2010. Chairman).

In 2013 - Chairman of the Board "TV channel" NBM-Radio, Kyiv

State activity
Ukrainian deputy of the IV Convocation from April 2002 till July 2005, constituency No. 77, Zaporizhia region, a self-promoted. "For" 15.99%, 14 opponents.

At the time of elections, was on position of Chief Editor - Executive Director of newspaper "MIG", non-party.

Became A member of political party "Nasha Ukraina" between May 2002 and February 2004, do not belong to any fraction (February - September 2004), a member of "Nasha Ukraina" (from September 2004).

Deputy Chairman of the Committee on Freedom of Speech (from June 2002). Resigned parliamentary powers on July 7, 2005

February 4 - November 8, 2005 - Head of Zaporizhia Regional State Administration.

Ukrainian deputy of V convocation from April 2006 to November 2007 Unit "Our Ukraine», No. 55 in the list. At the time of election, temporarily not working, a member of party "Nasha Ukraina". A member of the Unit "Our Ukraine" (since April 2006).

Deputy Chairman of the Committee on Environmental Policy, Natural Resources and Elimination of Consequences of Chornobyl Catastrophe (July 2006).

In 2008-2010. led the Public Council under the State Broadcasting Committee of Ukraine.

From July 2010 to June 2011. - Deputy Minister of Culture and Tourism of Ukraine, was in charge of tourism and the football championship Euro-2012.

From 2013 - Freelance Advisor to the Minister of Foreign Affairs of Ukraine.

July 7, 2014 President of Ukraine appointed chairman of the National television and radio broadcasting council of Ukraine. He resigned from this position on May 4, 2019.

Awards and recognition

The best journalist in Zaporozhia region (1988)
The award " Person of the Year " in the Zaporozhia region (1999)
"Triumph" (special award from the National Council for Radio and Television Ukraine ) - for the contribution to the development of television in Ukraine (2005)
"Honour" ( award MOD Ukraine )
Award of the President of Ukraine " Guardsman Revolution » The I degree
State employee of the III rank
Honored Journalist of Ukraine (2013)
The magazine "Focus" took Artemenko number 85 in the ranking of the "100 most influential Ukrainian in 2014".

References

External links
 Довідник «Хто є хто в Україні», видавництво «К.І.С.»

Fourth convocation members of the Verkhovna Rada
Fifth convocation members of the Verkhovna Rada
Governors of Zaporizhzhia Oblast
Our Ukraine (political party) politicians
Kyiv Polytechnic Institute alumni
1963 births
Living people